Parapedobacter defluvii is a Gram-negative, non-spore-forming, rod-shaped and non-motile  bacterium from the genus of Parapedobacter.

References

Sphingobacteriia
Bacteria described in 2017